Necronomicon Press is an American small press publishing house specializing in fiction, poetry and literary criticism relating to the horror and fantasy genres. It is run by Marc A. Michaud.

Necronomicon Press was founded in 1976, originally as an outlet for the works of H. P. Lovecraft, after whose fictitious grimoire, the Necronomicon, the firm is named. However, its repertoire expanded to include authors such as Robert E. Howard, Clark Ashton Smith, Ramsey Campbell, Hugh B. Cave, Joyce Carol Oates, Brian Lumley and Brian Stableford.

Necronomicon Press published critical works by such pioneering Lovecraft scholars as Dirk W. Mosig, Stefan R. Dziemianowicz, Kenneth W. Faig, and S. T. Joshi, including Joshi's biography, H. P. Lovecraft: A Life (1996).

The firm published critical journals such as Lovecraft Studies (now superseded by Lovecraft Annual published by Hippocampus Press) and Studies in Weird Fiction, both edited by Joshi; Crypt of Cthulhu, edited by Robert M. Price; and has also published critical studies of Campbell (The Count of Thirty, edited by Joshi) and Fritz Leiber (Witches of the Mind, written by Bruce Byfield).

Necronomicon Press was awarded the World Fantasy Award in 1994 and 1996 for its contributions to small-press publishing, and the British Fantasy Award in 1995 for its publication Necrofile: The Review of Horror Fiction.

Necronomicon Press' books are mostly illustrated by Jason Eckhardt and Robert H. Knox. Some of their titles, such as Lovecraft's The Colour Out of Space, contain original artwork from the amateur writers' magazines of Lovecraft's own time. One issue of Lovecraft Studies was illustrated by Sam Gafford.

A flood in March 2010 caused a loss of more than $20,000 worth of books. The press has since reactivated its website.

Selected publications
Crypt of Cthulhu 92–101, 108-113, edited by Robert M. Price
Cthulhu Codex 7–16, edited by Robert M. Price and Joseph S. Pulver
Demon and Other Tales by Joyce Carol Oates
Far Away & Never by Ramsey Campbell
Ghor, Kin-Slayer by Robert E. Howard
Ghoul Warning and Other Tales by Brian Lumley
H. P. Lovecraft: A Life by S. T. Joshi
Lovecraft Studies 31–45, edited by S. T. Joshi
Midnight Shambler 5–11, edited by Robert M. Price and Joseph S. Pulver
Mosig at Last: A Psychologist Looks at Lovecraft by Dirk W. Mosig
Necrofile: The Review of Horror Fiction 2–32 edited by S. T. Joshi, Michael Morrisson, and Stefan R. Dziemianowicz
Other Dimensions 1–3, edited by Stefan R. Dziemianowicz
Parts 14–15, edited by Robert M. Price
Studies in Weird Fiction 7–27, edited by S. T. Joshi
Tales of Lovecraftian Horror 7–10, edited by Robert M. Price

References

External links
 

American speculative fiction publishers
World Fantasy Award winners
Science fiction publishers
Small press publishing companies
Publishing companies established in 1976
1976 establishments in Rhode Island
West Warwick, Rhode Island
H. P. Lovecraft
Horror book publishing companies